Rebecca N. Wright (born 1967) is an American computer scientist known for her research in computer security. She is the Druckenmiller Professor of Computer Science at Barnard College.

Education and career
Wright was an undergraduate at Columbia University, graduating in 1988.
She went to Yale University for her graduate studies, and completed her Ph.D. there in 1994. Her dissertation, Achieving Perfect Secrecy Using Correlated Random Variables, was supervised by Michael J. Fischer.

Wright was employed at DIMACS at Rutgers University from 2007 to 2018, starting as deputy director and becoming director in 2011.
In January 2019 she moved to Barnard College, as the inaugural director of a new computer science program there.

Recognition
Wright was named an IEEE Fellow in 2017 "for contributions to applied cryptography and privacy".

In 2019 she won the Distinguished Service Award of SIGACT, part of the Association for Computing Machinery, "for her 11-year leadership of DIMACS, particularly in continuing and expanding the research and educational missions of DIMACS, for promoting diversity in computer science, and for using her expertise in privacy and security to help shape public policy on a national level".

References

External links
Home page at Rutgers

1967 births
Living people
American computer scientists
American women computer scientists
Columbia College (New York) alumni
Yale University alumni
Rutgers University faculty
Barnard College faculty
Fellow Members of the IEEE
American women academics
21st-century American women